The 2022 Leinster Senior Hurling Championship was the 2022 installment of the annual Leinster Senior Hurling Championship organised by Leinster GAA. Kilkenny were the defending champions having defeated Dublin in the 2021 final.

Team changes

To Championship
Promoted from the Joe McDonagh Cup

 Westmeath

From Championship
Relegated to the Joe McDonagh Cup

 Antrim

Teams
The Leinster championship was contested by five counties from the Irish province of Leinster, as well as one county from the province of Connacht, where the sport is only capable of supporting one county team at this level.

Personnel and general information

Group stage

Table
{| class="wikitable" style="text-align:center"
!width=20|
!width=150 style="text-align:left;"|Team
!width=20|
!width=20|
!width=20|
!width=20|
!width=45|
!width=45|
!width=20|
!width=20|
!Qualification Notes
|- style="background:#ccffcc"
|1||align=left| Galway ||5||4||1||0||7-143||5-95||+54||9
| rowspan="2" |Advance to Leinster Final
|- style="background:#ccffcc"
|2||align=left| Kilkenny||5||3||0||2||14-117||4-96||+51||6
|- style="background:#FFFFE0"
|3||align=left| Wexford ||5||2||2||1||8-106||4-98||+20||6
|Advance to Preliminary Quarter-Finals
|-
|4||align=left| Dublin||5||3||0||2||1-109||6-106||-12||6
| rowspan="2" |
|- style=
|5||align=left| Westmeath ||5||1||1||3||10-91||9-125||-31||3
|- style="background:#ffcccc" 
|6||align=left| Laois ||5||0||0||5||4-80||16-136||-92||0
|style="text-align:left;" | Relegation to Joe McDonagh Cup
|}

Group matches

Leinster round 1

Leinster round 2

Leinster round 3

Leinster round 4

Leinster round 5

Leinster Final

Kilkenny advanced to the 2022 All-Ireland SHC Semi-Finals, while Galway advanced to the 2022 All-Ireland SHC Quarter-Finals.

See also
2022 All-Ireland Senior Hurling Championship

2022 Munster Senior Hurling Championship

2022 Joe McDonagh Cup

Leinster Senior Hurling Championship

References

Leinster
Leinster Senior Hurling Championship